Currahee Mountain is a mountain located in Stephens County, Georgia, near Toccoa. The name appears to be derived from the Cherokee word ᏊᏩᎯ (quu-wa-hi) meaning "stand alone."
Technically a part of the Georgia Piedmont or "foothill" province, Currahee Mountain rises abruptly about 800 vertical feet (240 m) above the local topography and is the highest peak in Stephens County. Part of the mountain is in the Chattahoochee National Forest. On clear days, the peak's  summit is visible for many miles and is a prominent landmark to the southeast of Georgia's Blue Ridge Mountain crest.

Currahee Mountain is one of the landmarks used in the Treaty of Hopewell. It was also used by Benjamin Hawkins to run the Hawkins Line.

On October 12, 1864, Confederate troops defeated Union troops at the Battle of Narrows, also called the Battle of Currahee, during the Civil War. Casualties were small and the wounded were cared for by neighbors.

The mountain was made famous internationally by Tom Hanks' and Steven Spielberg's television miniseries Band of Brothers, in which it was featured as a training site of the American Paratroopers at Camp Toccoa, Georgia, where they ran up and down Currahee. The name of the mountain became a motto for these paratroopers, and inspired the quote "Three miles up, three miles down."

The Colonel Robert F. Sink memorial trail follows Currahee Mountain Road from the site of former Camp Toccoa to the summit of Currahee Mountain. The start of the trail is marked by a commemorative plaque dedicating the trail to "Col. Bob" Sink from the Five-O-Sinks (506th Parachute Infantry Regiment Association). The trail is currently the venue for the Annual Currahee Challenge, a three- and six-mile race on the mountain that occurs in the fall.
There is also a Run the first Saturday of June called the D Day Run held by the Camp Toccoa at Currahee organization.

It is also a popular destination for rock climbing and rappelling.  

One of the radio towers at the top holds NOAA Weather Radio station WWH24, serving parts of northeast Georgia and upstate South Carolina from NWS Greer.

References

External links
 
 
 Indian Boundary historical marker

Landforms of Stephens County, Georgia
Mountains of Georgia (U.S. state)
Chattahoochee-Oconee National Forest